Çuxanlı or Chukhonly or Chukhanly may refer to:
Çuxanlı, Absheron, Azerbaijan
Çuxanlı, Gobustan, Azerbaijan
Çuxanlı, Salyan, Azerbaijan